The final qualification repechage tournament for men's rugby sevens at the 2020 Summer Olympics was held on 18–20 June 2021 at Stade Louis II in Monaco. The tournament was originally scheduled for a year earlier, but was postponed until 2021 due to the global COVID-19 pandemic.

Twelve men's teams were eligible to compete in the repechage tournament, being the second and third ranked teams from the six continental qualifiers. Two teams, Brazil and China, withdrew a month before the competition due to challenges presented by the COVID-19 pandemic. A third team, Uganda, had to withdraw after members of their squad recorded positive COVID-19 test results on arrival in Monaco. This reduced the number of teams competing to nine.

Ireland won the repechage tournament, defeating France by 28–19 in the final, to qualify for the men's sevens tournament at the Tokyo Olympics.

Teams

 Notes:

Pool stage 
The teams were drawn into two pools with each team playing against all opponents in their own pool. Due to the late withdrawal of Uganda, all matches involving them were recorded as a bye for their opponents in Pool B.

Pool A

Pool B

Combined standings
After completion of the pool stage, the top two teams from each pool progressed to the knockout stage, with the winner of the final gaining qualification for the Olympic Sevens in Tokyo. Seedings for the knockouts were based on (a) pool placing, (b) competition points awarded (for a win, draw or loss) in the respective pool standings, and (c) difference between points scored and conceded across all pool matches played.

Knockout stage

Semi-finals

Final

Placings

See also
 2020 Women's Rugby Sevens Final Olympic Qualification Tournament

References

Final Olympic Qualification Tournament
Olympic Qualification Tournament
Rugby sevens
Rugby sevens
Rugby sevens